Mycobacterium seoulense is a species of Mycobacterium.

A closely related species with the proposed name of "Mycobacterium paraseoulense" has also been identified.

References

External links	
Type strain of Mycobacterium seoulense at BacDive -  the Bacterial Diversity Metadatabase

seoulense